Greenblatt's, also known as Greenblatt's Deli & Fine Wines, was a Jewish delicatessen established by Herman Greenblatt in 1926, and located on the Sunset Strip in West Hollywood, California until its eventual closing in August 2021. Greenblatt's was an "iconic LA restaurant" according to The Hollywood Reporter.

History
Greenblatt's Deli & Fine Wine Shop was initially located in South Central Los Angeles, which at the time was home to a large Jewish population, but it later moved to its current location on the Sunset Strip. Greenblatt's was established in 1926 by Herman Greenblatt, who would later sell the deli to the Kavin family in 1946. The Kavin family retained ownership of the deli for 75 years until its eventual closing in 2021.

Closing

After 95 years of operations Greenblatt's Deli closed its doors on August 12 2021. Longtime owner Jeff Kavin stated his intention to close the deli with dignity a little less than a month before the Jewish High Holiday season, and ensuing rush of catering orders.

Celebrity clientele

Greenblatt's boasted a long list of notable celebrity patrons including Kirk Douglas, Marilyn Monroe, Joe DiMaggio, Groucho Marx, Errol Flynn, Orson Welles, Janis Joplin, Bing Crosby, Peter Lawford, Boris Karloff, Bobby Darin, Rita Hayworth, Kirk Douglas, Bela Lugosi, Marlon Brando, Peter Lorre, Lenny Bruce, Robert Mitchum, John Belushi, Danny Kaye, and Billie Holiday were all said to be regulars at the deli.

See also
Mort's Palisades Deli
Langer's Deli
Canter's
Brent's Deli

References

External links
 Official Website

Sunset Boulevard (Los Angeles)
Landmarks in Los Angeles
History of Los Angeles
West Hollywood, California
Jews and Judaism in California
Jewish delicatessens in the United States
Defunct restaurants in Greater Los Angeles
Restaurants established in 1926
1926 establishments in California
Defunct Jewish delicatessens